Silvio Schaufelberger (born 21 March 1977) is a Swiss bobsledder who has competed from the late 1990s to the early 2000s. He won a silver medal in the four-man event at the 1999 FIBT World Championships.

Schaufelberger also finished fourth in the four-man event at the 2002 Winter Olympics in Salt Lake City.

References
Bobsleigh four-man world championship medalists since 1930
BBC news on the 2002 bobsleigh four-man results
FIBT profile

1977 births
Bobsledders at the 2002 Winter Olympics
Living people
Olympic bobsledders of Switzerland
Swiss male bobsledders